Robert John Nemanich is an American physicist.

Nemanich attended the Northern Illinois University, where he obtained bachelor's and master's degrees in physics, then continued studying the subject at the University of Chicago. After completing his doctorate in 1977, Nemanich began his teaching career at North Carolina State University, then moved to Arizona State University. He was elected a fellow of the American Physical Society in 1993 "[f]or his contributions to the application of Raman spectroscopy to the study of atomic structure is semiconducting thin films and interfaces." In 2016, Arizona State University awarded Nemanich a Regents' Professorship.

References

Living people
Year of birth missing (living people)
20th-century American physicists
21st-century American physicists
North Carolina State University faculty
Arizona State University faculty
Northern Illinois University alumni
University of Chicago alumni
Fellows of the American Physical Society